This article contains lists of women's national water polo team rosters of the United States of America.

Abbreviations

Olympic Games
Women's water polo tournaments have been staged at the Olympic Games since 2000. The United States has participated in 5 of 5 tournaments.

2000 Summer Olympics
Host city:  Sydney
Final Ranking: 2nd place ( Silver medal)
Head coach:  Guy Baker

2004 Summer Olympics
Host city:  Athens
Final Ranking: 3rd place ( Bronze medal)
Head coach:  Guy Baker

2008 Summer Olympics
Host city:  Beijing
Final Ranking: 2nd place ( Silver medal)
Head coach:  Guy Baker

2012 Summer Olympics
Host city:  London
Final Ranking: 1st place ( Gold medal)
Head coach:  Adam Krikorian

2016 Summer Olympics
Host city:  Rio de Janeiro
Final Ranking: 1st place ( Gold medal)
Head coach:  Adam Krikorian

World Aquatics Championships
Women's water polo tournaments have been staged at the World Aquatics Championships since 1986. The United States has participated in 14 of 14 tournaments.

FINA Water Polo World Cup
The FINA Women's Water Polo World Cup was established in 1979. The United States has participated in 17 of 17 tournaments.

Pan American Games
Women's water polo tournaments have been staged at the Pan American Games since 1999. The United States has participated in 6 of 6 tournaments.

See also
 List of United States men's national water polo team rosters
 United States women's national water polo team
 USA Water Polo

References

External links
Official website

Women's national rosters
National women's rosters
United States National women's rosters